Local elections in Pateros were held on May 9, 2016 within the Philippine general election. The voters elected for the elective local posts in the city: the mayor, vice mayor, District representative, and councilors, six in each of the city's two legislative districts.

Background
Incumbent City Mayor Jaime C. Medina will not seek reelection, instead, Willie Buenaventura is running under the Nacionalista Party. His opponents are Ike Ponce of the Liberal Party, Jorge Nicdao of the Nationalist People's Coalition, Delfin Dela Rosa and beauty queen-turned-actress Daisy Reyes running as independent candidates.

Incumbent Vice Mayor Gerald German is running for his second term. His opponents are Bebot Cuerdo, Elmer Mangoba and Venancio Santidad.

Candidates

Representative

Mayor

Vice Mayor

Councilors

Team Willie

I Love Pateros

Team AIG

Shine Pateros

District 1

|-bgcolor=black
|colspan=8|

District 2

|-bgcolor=black
|colspan=8|

References

2016 Philippine local elections
Elections in Pateros
2016 elections in Metro Manila